Praemendesia is an extinct genus of moths in the family Elachistidae. It was described by Kozlov in 1987. It contains the species P. minima, which was described from Baltic amber in the Russian Federation. It is dated to the Eocene.

References

Fossil taxa described in 1987
Fossil Lepidoptera
Elachistidae
Eocene insects
Prehistoric insects of Europe